Geoffrey Dean Hodgson (born 22 October 1966) is a former English cricketer. Hodgson played as a right-handed opening batsman. He was born in Carlisle, Cumberland and played Minor Counties cricket for Cumberland County Cricket Club between 1984 and 1989, initially whilst studying human biology at Loughborough University.

Whilst a student, Hodgson played for Lancashire Second XI before joining Warwickshire for two seasons between 1987 and 1988. He made a single senior appearance for the county in 1987 before joining Gloucestershire in 1989. After initially playing mainly in the second XI, Hodgson came close to retiring as a professional before being called in to the first XI due to other players not being available and scoring well. He played in over 100 first-class cricket matches for Gloucestershire in a career which lasted until the end of the 1995 season.

References

External links

1966 births
Living people
Sportspeople from Carlisle, Cumbria
Cricketers from Cumbria
English cricketers
Cumberland cricketers
Warwickshire cricketers
Gloucestershire cricketers